The Somerset County Gazette is a weekly tabloid newspaper in Somerset, England.

It is published in a tabloid format on a weekly basis and has a circulation of about 10,195 based on its last published ABC figures to December 2018.Since then it has left the ABC and failed to publish any circulation figures for the newspaper.

It was founded in 1836, and is now owned by Newsquest.

The newspaper was re-launched in November 2016, under the County Gazette masthead, with the tagline 'Somerset's heartbeat', losing the full Somerset County Gazette logo and web address from the front page.

The County Gazette's sports coverage received an Highly Commended honour for Outstanding Newspaper Coverage at the 2018 Domestic Cricket Journalism Awards, which are organised by the England and Wales Cricket Board.

The newspaper, including editorial and advertising teams, is based in Taunton, Somerset. The Somerset County Gazette moved out of its historic offices close to Somerset County Cricket Club to new offices at Tangier Way, in February 2019.

References

Newspapers published in Somerset